Makryneia is a former municipality in Aetolia-Acarnania, West Greece, Greece. Since the 2011 local government reform it is part of the municipality Agrinio, of which it is a municipal unit. The municipal unit has an area of 149.687 km2. Population 3,681 (2011). The seat of the municipality was in Gavalou. The municipal unit is located south and southeast of Lake Trichonida, and northwest of the mountain Arakynthos. There are farmlands near the lake shore, and forests on the mountain slopes. Makryneia is southeast of Agrinio, northeast of Missolonghi and northwest of Naupactus.

Subdivisions
The municipal unit Makryneia is subdivided into the following communities (constituent villages in brackets):
Agios Andreas or Bourlesia (Agios Andreas, Ano Metapa)
Akres or Lithovouni (Akres, Saranti, Varka)
Dafnias (Dafnias, Palaiozefgaro)
Gavalou (Gavalou,  Kourtelaiika)
Kato Makrinou
Kapsorachi (Kapsorachi, Palaiochori)
Makrinou (Makrinou, Agia Triada, Agioi Apostoloi, Kypseli, Metaxas)
Mesarista (Mesarista, Kazanaiika, Paradeisi, Tsiligiannaika)
Potamoula Trichonidas
Trichonio

Population

External links
Makryneia on dhmoi.gr
http://makrinia.tripod.com 
 Makryneia on GTP Travel Pages

References

Populated places in Aetolia-Acarnania